Nijmegen Goffert is a railway station located in the south west of Nijmegen, Netherlands. The station opened on 14 December 2014 and is located on the Tilburg–Nijmegen railway. The train services are operated by Nederlandse Spoorwegen.

Train services
The station is served by the following service(s):

2x per hour local services (stoptrein) Arnhem - Nijmegen - Oss - 's-Hertogenbosch - Dordrecht
2x per hour, rush hours only, additional local services (stoptrein) Zutphen - Nijmegen - Wijchen

References

External links
 NS
 Dutch Public Transport journey planner

Goffert
Railway stations opened in 2014